, commonly known as King Records, is a Japanese record company founded in January 1931 as a division of the Japanese publisher Kodansha. It initially began operating as an independent entity in the 1950s. It later became part of the Otowa Group. Today, King Records is one of Japan's largest record companies which is not owned by a multinational entity. The label's headquarters are in Bunkyo, Tokyo.

The label's name is actually based from the now-defunct Kingu magazine published by Kodansha from 1924 to 1957.

Sub-labels
Its Starchild label, was managed by animation producer Toshimichi Ōtsuki, specialised in anime music and film. King Records also distributes the Up-Front Works–owned and –operated labels Piccolo Town and Rice Music, and also released video games for the PC-88, Famicom, Game Boy Advance, and MSX2 platforms. On February 1, 2016, King Records restructured Starchild and renamed it King Amusement Creative.

Paddle Wheel Records is a division of King Record Co.

You! Be Cool is the official sub-label for AKB48.

Venus-B is the company's official urban music imprint.

Evil Line Records is the label's new division, established in April 2014, and comprises artists like Momoiro Clover Z and Meg, among others.

Nexus is the label's division specialized for metal/underground music from Japan also overseas. Notable artists in it label are Earthshaker, etc.

Seven Seas is the label's division focusing on world music from overseas artists in many genres.

Notable artists

 Bolbbalgan4
Stomu Yamashta
 Inoran
 Kana Uemura
 Diedrich Hartmann
 Nogod
 Takeshi Terauchi
 Miho Nakayama
 Hiroko Moriguchi
 AKB48 (You, Be Cool!)
 Morning Musume
 Tomomi Itano
 Atsuko Maeda
 Yuki Kashiwagi (AKB48)
 Momoland
 Miss Monochrome
 Aice5 (Evil Line)
 Earphones (Evil Line)
 Hypnosis Mic (Evil Line)
 Otsuki Miyako
 Momoiro Clover Z (Evil Line, formerly Starchild)
 Meg (Evil Line)
 Lynch.
 Theatre Brook
 Haruka Fukuhara
 Sawa (Bellwood)
 Park Junyoung
 Hiroki Nanami
 Jan Linton (as dr jan guru) "Planet Japan"
 Rock A Japonica (Evil Line)
 Senri Kawaguchi
 Block B
 Yuki Uchida
 Nana Mizuki (King Amusement Creative)
 Mamoru Miyano (King Amusement Creative)
 Suneohair (King Amusement Creative)
 Ryoko Shiraishi (King Amusement Creative)
 angela (King Amusement Creative)
 Ai Nonaka (King Amusement Creative)
 Yoko Takahashi (King Amusement Creative)
 Soichiro Hoshi (King Amusement Creative)
 Sumire Uesaka (King Amusement Creative)
 Inori Minase (King Amusement Creative)
 Shouta Aoi (King Amusement Creative)
 Satomi Sato (King Amusement Creative)
 Yuuma Uchida (King Amusement Creative)
 Yui Horie (King Amusement Creative)
 Niji no Conquistador (King Amusement Creative)
 B2takes! (King Amusement Creative)
 Miho Okasaki (King Amusement Creative)
 AMATSUKI

Former artists
 Alice Nine (2005-2010; to Tokuma Japan Communications)
 CHAGE and ASKA (1985-1999; to Toshiba EMI)
 Eri Kitamura (2011-2016; to TMS Music)
 GFriend (2018-2021)
 Kagrra,
 Masumi Asano
 Matenrou Opera (to self-owned amairo records)
 Mikako Komatsu (2012-2016; to Toy's Factory)
 Megumi Hayashibara (1991-2019; freelance)
 Masami Okui (1993-2004; to Geneon until 2011 when she signed with Lantis)
 Michiyo Azusa
 Minori Chihara (2004)
 Neko Jump (2006-2011; Former overseas partner of Kamikaze)
 Sound Horizon to Pony Canyon 
 the pillows (1994-2006; to avex trax)
 the GazettE (2005-2010; to Sony Music Japan)
 TWO-MIX (1995-1998; to Warner Music Japan)
 YuiKaori
 Yui Sakakibara to 5pb. Records
 Yui Ogura (2012-2022; King Amusement Creative; to Nippon Columbia)
 Yukari Tamura
 Yuko Ogura

See also
 Starchild, the former label under King Records

References

External links
 King Records Japan 
 King Records Japan 
 King Amusement Creative 
 Venus-B
 

 
1931 establishments in Japan
Bunkyō
Mass media companies based in Tokyo
IFPI members
Japanese record labels
Kodansha
Pop record labels
Record labels established in 1931